Krissy & Ericka is a Filipino pop-acoustic music duo.

History
Krissy and Ericka Villongco are sisters. Ericka was born 10 months earlier than Krissy. Her cousin, Cris Villonco, also a stage actress and singer. They first appeared on YouTube and doing covers. A cover of Taylor Swift's "Sparks Fly", made with AJ Rafael, was shown on Ryan Seacrest's website, and they were signed to MCA Music.

In 2009, they released their self-titled debut album under MCA Records.

In 2012, they released a single titled "12:51" as the lead single for their second album, Twelve: Fifty One.
In 2014, Krissy released her first solo single "We Can't Be".

Discography

Albums
 Krissy & Ericka (2009)
 Twelve: Fifty One (2012)

Singles
 "Up Up, Down Down" (2009)
 "Runaway" (2010)
 "Don't Say You Love Me" (2010)
 "12:51" (2012)
 "In Your Arms" (2012)
 "We can't be (2014)

Awards and nominations

References

Filipino pop music groups
Filipino girl groups
Star Magic
Filipino musical duos
Sibling musical duos
Musical groups established in 2008
2008 establishments in the Philippines
Pop music duos
Female musical duos